The 40th Pathans were an infantry regiment of the British Indian Army. It was raised in 1858 as the Shahjehanpur Levy. It was designated as the 40th Pathans in 1903 and became 5th Battalion (Pathans) 14th Punjab Regiment in 1922. In 1947, it was allocated to the Pakistan Army, where it continues to exist as 16th Battalion The Punjab Regiment.

Early history
The regiment was raised by Lieutenant Edward Dandridge at Shahjahanpur in 1858, during the upheaval of the Indian Mutiny, as the Shahjahanpur Levy. It was initially composed of Hindus from North India and some Sikhs. In 1888, the regiment participated in the Black Mountain Expedition, while in 1890, it dispatched a detachment to Lushai Hills. In 1890, it was reconstituted with Trans-frontier Pathans to become the only all-Pathan regiment in the Indian Army; acquiring in the process, the nickname of "Forty Thieves". In 1901, it lost its exclusively Pathan character, when two companies each of Punjabi Muslims and Dogras were included.

40th Pathans
Subsequent to the reforms brought about in the Indian Army by Lord Kitchener in 1903, the regiment's designation was changed to 40th Pathans. In 1904, the 40th Pathans proceeded to Tibet as reinforcements for the Tibet Mission Force. On the outbreak of the First World War the regiment was stationed in Hong Kong. It arrived in France on 2 April 1915, and within days, was on the frontlines. The 40th Pathans fought with great gallantry in the Second Battle of Ypres, where they suffered 320 casualties on 26 April, and in the Battles of Aubers Ridge and Loos. In December, the regiment left for East Africa, where they served till February 1918, and again distinguished themselves in the long and bitter campaign. The 40th Pathans suffered a total of 800 casualties (killed or wounded) during the war, while 1066 officers and men were invalided out of service due to sickness. In 1919, the 40th Pathans participated in the Third Afghan War.

British and Indian officers who died in World War I
European campaign
Lt Col F. Rennik
BT Lt Col A.G. Stuart
Maj G.D. Campbell (while attached to Argyll and Sutherland Highlanders)
Maj Ac.E.C. Perking
Capt J.F.C. Dalmahoy
Capt L.de.L Christopher
2nd Lt E.G. Hodgson
Sub Jehandad Khan Bahadur
Jemadar Lehar Singh
Jemadar Saida Khan
Jemadar Kaka

East African campaign
Maj H.A. Carter
Maj E.C. Irwin
Maj R.N. Maepherson
2nd Lt F.G. Gardiner
2nd Lt J.T.G. Humphreys
2nd Lt N.O. Burne
Sub Gulodu
Sub Mainu
Jemadar Shiraz
Jemadar Darjhodah
 Sub Major Habib Ullah Khan

Pre-1947 partition

In 1921-22, a major reorganization was undertaken in the British Indian Army leading to the formation of large infantry groups of four to six battalions. Among these was the 14th Punjab Regiment, formed by grouping the 40th Pathans with 19th, 20th, 21st, 22nd and 24th Punjabis. The battalion's new designation was 5th Battalion (Pathans) 14th Punjab Regiment. During the Second World War, the battalion fought in the Malayan Campaign and was taken prisoner by the Japanese on Singapore Island following the British surrender on 15 February 1942.

Post-1947 partition 
The battalion was re-raised in 1952. In the meantime, the 14th Punjab Regiment had been allocated to the Pakistan Army following the independence in 1947. In 1956, the 14th Punjab Regiment was merged with the 1st, 15th and 16th Punjab Regiments to form one large Punjab Regiment, and 5/14th Punjab was redesignated as 16 Punjab. During the 1965 and 1971 Indo-Pakistan Wars, the battalion fought on the Lahore Front.

Genealogy
1780 Raised as Bengal Native Infantry
1858 Shahjahanpur Levy
1861 44th Regiment of Bengal Native Infantry
1861 40th Regiment of Bengal Native Infantry
1864 40th (Shahjahanpur) Regiment of Bengal Native Infantry
1885 40th Regiment of Bengal Infantry
1890 40th (Baluch) Regiment of Bengal Infantry
1892 40th (Pathan) Regiment of Bengal Infantry
1901 40th Punjab Infantry
1903 40th Pathans
1922 5th Battalion 14th Punjab Regiment
1934 5th Battalion (Pathans) 14th Punjab Regiment
1942 Captured by the Japanese at Singapore
1952 Re-raised
1956 16th Battalion The Punjab Regiment

See also
14th Punjab Regiment
Punjab Regiment

References

Further reading
Waters, Maj RS. (1936). History of the 5th Battalion (Pathans) 14th Punjab Regiment formerly 40th Pathans ("The Forty Thieves”). London: James Bain Ltd.
Waters, RS. (c. 1945). Continuation of the History of the 5th Battalion (Pathans) 14th Punjab Regiment 1937-1942. London: Lund Humphries.
The 40th Pathans in the Great War. (1921). Lahore: The Civil and Military Gazette Press.
Haig, Brodie. Fourteenth Punjab Regiment 1939-1945. London: Lund Humphries, n.d.
Rizvi, Brig SHA. (1984). Veteran Campaigners – A History of the Punjab Regiment 1759-1981. Lahore: Wajidalis.
Cardew, Lt FG. (1903). A Sketch of the Services of the Bengal Native Army to the Year 1895. Calcutta: Military Department.

External links
 

Punjab Regiment (Pakistan)
British Indian Army infantry regiments
Military units and formations established in 1858
1858 establishments in India